Christian Life Academy, and later The Church Academy, was a private, non-denominational Christian school in Baton Rouge, Louisiana. It was founded as Christian Life Academy in 1981 and closed in 2017. The school reopened in 2018 as The Church Academy, but closed again in 2019. Thousands of students have attended this K-12 academy including people of influence in the business and sports communities.

History
Christian Life Fellowship opened its doors in 1976, and the Academy began in 1981 with grades 7 through 10. The following year grades Kindergarten through 12 were available. Christian Life Academy was a comprehensive school offering a college-preparatory education in a Christian atmosphere. Christian Life Academy provided for grades PS-12, including a nursery and daycare. In July 2016, The Church International took ownership of Christian Life Fellowship and Christian Life Academy.

The campus was located on 55 wooded acres in south Baton Rouge off of Perkins Road. The campus had space devoted to administrative offices, classrooms, libraries, cafeterias, a gymnasium, three athletic fields, field houses, and nursery and daycare facilities. Specialized facilities included art rooms, a choir room, a band room, a theatrical stage, a computer lab, labs for biology, chemistry, and physics, an elementary science lab, locker rooms and weight training rooms.

Mission
The mission of Christian Life Academy is to present Jesus Christ as the focus of all truth through excellent academics, wholesome extra-curricular activities and as a foundation for all relationships.

Fine Arts Department
CLA had many venues for those interesting in studying fine arts, including art, choir, theater, and band. Every Spring the Fine Arts Department hosted a "Celebration of the Arts" Festival to showcase the many talents of the students. This venue was also how they raised money to fund the purchase of music and art supplies.

Each year the drama department put on a play in the Fall and a musical in the Spring. One of the most outstanding plays was "Gossip". The musical variety included "West Side Story", "Godspell", Grease, "School House Rock",  and High School Musical.

The choir was outstanding and received superior ratings on various occasions. The choir performed at Disney and also traveled to San Antonio receiving superior at all competitions.

The band performed in many different venues throughout the year: marching at the football games, marching in parades and performing in one of their annual concerts. In its competition in Orlando in 2010 the band earned a ranking of "Excellent", while in Dallas in 2011, they earned multiple superior ratings. In Spring of 2015, they scored Superiors in Atlanta, GA.

Sports
CLA was known for its competitive sports programs having been the Louisiana State Basketball Champions in 1996, 2003, 2006, 2007, 2008, 2010 and 2012 in their division. NFL players Michael Clayton and Dillon Farrell attended 
CLA and graduated from this institution. Basketball player and CLA 2010 graduate Langston Galloway signed with the New York Knicks in 2014 after setting several school records at Saint Joseph's University. Also Davis Alford, class of 2017. He would go on to play football at Louisiana College and be a force. He is now retired from football.

Notable alumni
Frank Bartley (born 1994), basketball player for Ironi Ness Ziona of the Israeli Basketball Premier League
Johnathan Stove (born 1995), basketball player for Hapoel Galil Elyon of the Israeli Basketball Premier League

Micahel Rashard Clayton (born October 13, 1982) is a former American football wide receiver who played professionally in the National Football League (NFL). He was drafted by the Tampa Bay Buccaneers 15th overall in the 2004 NFL draft. He played college football at LSU.

Caleb Parr, OTA (born November 25, 1993), former lifeguard at Blue Bayou and Dixie Landin' and prominent member of the New Orleans community.

References

External links
 Christian Life Academy at Highschoolsports.net
 Christian Life Academy & McAlisters Deli Team Up for Fundraiser
 LSU Homecoming Parade 2015 - Crusader Band
 Mindy Rose Teacher of Honor

1981 establishments in Louisiana
2019 disestablishments in Louisiana
Christian schools in Louisiana
Educational institutions established in 1981
Educational institutions disestablished in 2019
Private high schools in Louisiana
Private middle schools in Louisiana
Private elementary schools in Louisiana
Schools in Baton Rouge, Louisiana